Beat Häsler (born 17 July 1936) is a Swiss former luger. He competed in the men's doubles event at the 1964 Winter Olympics.

References

External links
 

1936 births
Living people
Swiss male lugers
Olympic lugers of Switzerland
Lugers at the 1964 Winter Olympics
People from Davos
Sportspeople from Graubünden